Gujarat is the 6th largest state in India, located in the western part of India with a coastline of 1,600 km (longest in India). It is a popular tourist destination in the country and was visited by 19.5 million domestic tourists (9th Rank in the India) and 210 thousand international tourists (11th Rank in India) in 2020.

Gujarat offers scenic beauty from Great Rann of Kutch to the hills of Saputara. Gujarat is the one and only place to view pure Asiatic lions in the world. During the Sultanate reign, Hindu craftsmanship mixed with Islamic architecture, giving rise to the Indo-Saracenic style. Many structures in the state are built in this fashion. It is also the birthplace of Shrimad Rajchandra,  Mahatma Gandhi and Sardar Vallabhbhai Patel, iconic figures of India's independence movement. In recent years Statue Of Unity has emerged as the major tourist spot of Gujarat. It is the tallest statue in the world.

Amitabh Bachchan is currently the brand ambassador of Gujarat Tourism. The ‘Khushboo Gujarat Ki' campaign by celebrity Amitabh Bachchan has increased tourism in Gujarat by 14 per cent per annum, twice that of national growth rate.

Ahmedabad is considered an ideal starting point to enter the state with its central location and a well connected international airport (~5.7 million passengers during 2021/22 ). Moreover, The well-developed transport infrastructure eases the connectivity to all parts of the state.

Business tourism

Gujarat is one of the most industrialized states in the country.  There are many Indian and global companies located in Gujarat and the area has seen double digit GDP growth in past decade. It is also known as "Growth Engine of India".

Vibrant Gujarat is biennial investors' summit held by the government of Gujarat. The event is aimed at bringing together business leaders, investors, corporations, thought leaders, policy and opinion makers; the summit is advertised as a platform to understand and explore business opportunities in the state. It has become a model for economic success for many states. According to the list of the top 10 Indian cities by GDP in 2009, based on a PricewaterhouseCoopers study, Ahmedabad ranks 7th in India with an annual GDP of US$59 billion.

Gujarat International Finance Tec-City is an under-construction city in Gujarat. It will be located next to the Sabarmati river, 12 km north of Ahmedabad and 8 km South of Gandhinagar, the political capital of the state. Its main purpose is to provide high-quality physical infrastructure so that finance and tech firms can relocate their operations there from Mumbai, Bangalore, Gurgaon and other regions where infrastructure is either inconsistent or very expensive.

Hill stations

 Wilson Hills
 Saputara
 Pavagadh Hill

Archeological and heritage tourism
Within Gujarat there are a wide variety of historic forts, palaces, mosques, temples, and places of historical importance in India's struggle for independence. Many of these palaces and forts have been converted into heritage hotels to keep tourists close to the vibrant history of Gujarat. For example, Laxmi Vilas Palace, Vadodara is reputed to have been the largest private dwelling built at the time and it is four times the size of Buckingham Palace in London.  These sites are under-developed and are considered to have huge development potential. World heritage sites like Lothal, Dholavira and Champaner are also located within Gujarat.

Cultural tourism

Gujarat is well known for its rich culture. The folk arts of Gujarat form a major part of the culture of the state. It preserves the rich tradition of song, dance, drama as well. Handicrafts include Bandhani, patolas of Patan, kutchhi work, Khadi, bamboo craft, block printing, embroidery, woodcraft, metal crafts, pottery, namda, rogan painting, pithora and many more handicrafts. The Arabs, Portuguese, Dutch, Mughals and British as well as Parsis have left their mark on Gujarat's culture.

Religious tourism

Gujarat is home to a multitude of both Hindu and Jain devotional centres and pilgrimages with famous temples such as Dwarka, Dakor, Radha Damodar Temple, Junagadh, Ambaji, Palitana, Mahudi, Shankheshwar, Hutheesing Jain Temple, Somnath, Girnar, Shamlaji, Bahucharaji, Pavagadh, Kabirvad, Sun Temple, Modhera, Akshardham (Gandhinagar), Shri Swaminarayan Mandir, Ahmedabad, Vasai Jain Temple, Ashapura Mata, Swaminarayan Temple, Ahmedabad, Narayan Sarovar, Tulsi Shyam, Sattadhar, Lojpur, Junagadh Buddhist Cave Groups etc. The Palitana temples of Jainism on Mount Shatrunjaya, Palitana are considered the holiest of all pilgrimage places by the Svetambara Jain community. Palitana is the world's only mountain with more than 900 temples.

Gujarat is also known for the world-famous shrine of Shehenshah-e-Gujarat Hazrat Syed Ali Meera Datar, a government heritage site. The shrine of Hazrat Syed Ali Meera Datar Baba sees thousands of visitors from all religions blessings every day. Followers of the shrine believe that each and every problem and suffering of human life can be solved by the spiritual force of shrine, which is situated in a small village named Unava(mehsana), about 90 km from Ahmedabad.

Wildlife tourism

Gujarat is habitat for the world's rarest as well large number of fauna and flora. Fauna includes Asiatic lions, wild ass, blackbuck, bears, monkeys, nilgai, paradise flycatcher, chinkara, dolphins, whale shark and migratory birds like flamingos, pelican, and storks. Flora includes species of khair, sadad, timru, babul, salai, khakro, ber, asundro and bordi. The state also has national park. Sanctuaries at Gir National Park, Marine National Park, Gulf of Kutch, Vansda National Park, Nalsarovar Bird Sanctuary, Kutch Bustard Sanctuary, Purna Wildlife Sanctuary and Blackbuck National Park, Velavadar.

Tourism Department along with Forest Department of Gujarat are maintaining many campsites to promote ecotourism in Gujarat.

Fairs and festivals

Gujarat celebrates unique festivals like "Navratri Garba" (October–November,all over the state),"Diwali" (November), "Kite Festival (Makar Sankranti,11–15 January, Ahmedabad), "Kankaria Carnival" (25–31 December, Ahmedabad), "Rann Utsav" (November–December, Kutch), "Modhera Dance Festival" (3rd week January, Modhera) and fairs like Tarnetar Fair (August, Tarnetar) & Vautha Mela (November, Vautha).

Medical tourism
Ahmedabad leading city of the state is the most preferred place for medical tour or medical treatments in India. With world class health facilities and affordable cost, the city is becoming one of the most sought medical tourism center in the country. The 108 Service is the highly appreciated ‘Medical at doorstep’ Service. More than 1500 foreigners visit the state per year for various treatments in the state. Ahmedabad Civil Hospital is the biggest hospital in Asia located at Ahmedabad. There are many new upcoming hospitals coming in the city too.

Royal Orient Train
The Royal Orient Train is an Indian luxury tourism train that runs between Gujarat and Rajasthan, covering important tourist locations in the two states. The train started in 1994-95 as a joint venture of the Tourism Corporation of Gujarat and the Indian Railways. There are 13 coaches in the train, named after erstwhile kingdoms of Rajputana. The coaches provide five-star hotel comforts to passengers. Cabins are furnished in a palatial style and have spacious baths attached. There are multi-cuisine restaurants that offer Rajasthani, Gujarati, Indian, Chinese and continental cuisine. The Royal Orient train also has a bar on board, as well as a lounge in every coach where passengers can read books and magazines, watch television, listen to music and interact with other passengers. Other facilities include an intercom, channel music, TV, DVD system and a massage-cum-beauty parlor. The Royal Orient offers a 7-day/8-night package that covers important heritage tourist locations in Rajasthan and Gujarat. The train starts from Delhi Cantonment station and has stops at Chittorgarh, Jaipur, Udaipur, Ahmedabad, Mehsana, Junagarh, Veraval, Sasan Gir, Mandvi, Palitana and Sarkhej.

Gallery

Outline of tourism in India

 Buddhist pilgrimage sites in India
 Coral reefs in India
 Hindu pilgrimage sites in India
 Incredible India
 List of aquaria in India
 List of beaches in India
 List of botanical gardens in India
 List of ecoregions in India
 List of forests in India
 List of forts in India
 List of gates in India
 List of Geographical Indications in India
 List of hill stations in India
 List of lakes of India
 List of mountains in India
 List of national parks of India
 List of protected areas of India
 List of rivers of India
 List of rock-cut temples in India
 List of stadiums in India
 List of State Protected Monuments in India
 List of waterfalls in India
 List of World Heritage Sites in India
 List of zoos in India
 Medical tourism in India
 Wildlife sanctuaries of India

External links
 
 Gujarat Tourism- Official Government Website

References 

 
Gujarat